Magnifique is the fifth studio album by Ratatat, released on July 17, 2015. Ratatat began touring in early 2015 with limited stops in the midwestern US and the Coachella music festival where new songs were debuted. On April 12, 2015, the band released "Cream on Chrome", the first single from the album. On June 16, 2015, "Abrasive" was released as the second single. The album features a cover of the 1971 Springwater single "I Will Return" and cover artwork collage sketches by Evan Mast and Mike Stroud.

Reception
At Metacritic, which assigns a weighted average score out of 100 to reviews from mainstream critics, Magnifique received an average score of 70 based on 22 reviews, indicating "generally favorable reviews".

Track listing

Charts

Weekly charts

Year-end charts

References

External links
 

2015 albums
Ratatat albums
XL Recordings albums
Albums produced by E*vax